This is the list of cathedrals in Honduras sorted by denomination.

Roman Catholic 
Cathedrals of the Roman Catholic Church in Honduras:
 Cathedral of the Immaculate Conception in Choluteca
Cathedral of the Immaculate Conception in Comayagua
 Cathedral of the Immaculate Conception in Juticalpa
 Cathedral of St. Isidore the Worker in La Ceiba
 Cathedral of St. Peter the Apostle in San Pedro Sula
 Catedral de Santa Rosa in Santa Rosa de Copán
Cathedral of St. Michael the Archangel in Tegucigalpa
Cathedral of St. John the Baptist in Trujillo
Catedral Las Mercedes in El Progreso

Anglican
Cathedrals of the Province 9 of the Episcopal Church in the United States of America:
 Catedral El Buen Pastor San Pedro Sula in San Pedro Sula

See also
Lists of cathedrals

References

Cathedrals
Honduras
Cathedrals